The 2016 Armenian Cup Final was the 25th Armenian Cup Final, and the final match of the 2015–16 Armenian Cup. It was played at the Republican Stadium in Yerevan, Armenia, on 4 May 2016, and was contested by Banants and Mika. 

It was both Banants and Mika's eighth cup final appearance, with Mika suffering defeat in the previous years final to Pyunik, with Banants last appearance coming in 2010 and also ending in defeat to Pyunik. Banants won 2–0, with both goals coming in the first-half, thanks to a Laércio penalty and a Atsamaz Burayev strike.

Match

Details

References

Armenian Cup Finals
Cup Final